Dorcadion parallelum is a species of beetle in the family Cerambycidae. It was described by Küster in 1847. It is known from Palestine, Syria, and Turkey.

See also 
Dorcadion

References

parallelum
Beetles described in 1847